Robert Ronald Murphy (April 10, 1933 – March 6, 2014) was a Canadian professional ice hockey player who played for the New York Rangers, Chicago Black Hawks, Detroit Red Wings and Boston Bruins over the course of an 889-game National Hockey League (NHL) career between 1952 and 1970.

Playing career
Murphy played the better part of 18 years between 1952 and 1970, most notably on a Bruins line with Phil Esposito and Ken Hodge, which broke the league record for scoring by a forward line in the 1968–69 NHL season with 263 points. The record was subsequently broken two years later by Esposito, Hodge and Wayne Cashman. 1968–69 represented a comeback year for Murphy, who had missed most of the preceding two seasons following multiple operations on a chronically bad shoulder, and he initially retired after that season. His health improving over the summer, Murphy rejoined the Bruins for the beginning of the 1970 season, but recurrences of his chronic injuries reduced him to spot duty over 20 games, and he retired for good in March 1970.

Murphy's career was nearly cut short late in the second period of a New York Rangers' 3–1 victory over the Montreal Canadiens at Madison Square Garden on December 20, 1953. During a stick-swinging incident with Montreal's Boom Boom Geoffrion, the then-20-year-old left wing sustained a broken jaw and concussion after Geoffrion took a two-handed swing and made contact with the left side of Murphy's face. Murphy was suspended for five games for his role in the incident, but the injuries cost him the remainder of the season. Geoffrion was banned from all matches between the two teams for the rest of the campaign. The incident was recorded on black-and-white film used by Rangers coach Frank Boucher. The footage was discovered in 2011 when MSG Media moved its film and videotape archive out of Madison Square Garden while the building was undergoing renovations.

Post-playing career
After his retirement he coached the Kitchener Rangers of the Ontario Hockey League. He was with Stanley Cup-winning teams with the Black Hawks in 1961 and the Bruins in 1970.

Murphy died on March 6, 2014, at the age of 80.

Career statistics

Regular season and playoffs

References

External links
 
 Picture of Ron Murphy's Name on the 1970 Stanley Cup Plaque

1933 births
2014 deaths
Boston Bruins players
Canadian ice hockey coaches
Canadian ice hockey left wingers
Chicago Blackhawks players
Cincinnati Mohawks (AHL) players
Detroit Red Wings players
Guelph Biltmore Mad Hatters players
Ice hockey people from Ontario
Kitchener Rangers coaches
New York Rangers players
Oklahoma City Blazers (1965–1977) players
Providence Reds players
Saskatoon Quakers players
Sportspeople from Hamilton, Ontario
Stanley Cup champions